A partridge is a medium-sized galliform bird in any of several genera, with a wide native distribution throughout parts of Europe, Asia and Africa. Several species have been introduced to the Americas. They are sometimes grouped in the Perdicinae subfamily of the Phasianidae (pheasants, quail, etc.). However, molecular research suggests that partridges are not a distinct taxon within the family Phasianidae, but that some species are closer to the pheasants, while others are closer to the junglefowl.

Description
Partridges are medium-sized game birds, (Also known as Ditch Chickens in the Mid-West), generally intermediate in size between the larger pheasants, smaller quail; they're ground-dwelling birds that feature variable plumage colouration across species, with most tending to grey and brown.

Range and habitat
Partridges are native to Europe, Asia, Africa, and the Middle East. Some species are found nesting on steppes or agricultural land, while other species prefer more forested areas. They nest on the ground and have a diet consisting of seeds and insects.

Hunting
Species such as the grey partridge and the red-legged partridge are popular as game birds, and are often reared in captivity and released for the purpose of hunting. For the same reason, they have been introduced into large areas of North America.

Cultural references
According to Greek legend, the first partridge appeared when Daedalus threw his nephew, Perdix, off the sacred hill of Athena in a fit of jealous rage. Supposedly mindful of his fall, the bird does not build its nest in the trees, nor take lofty flights and avoids high places.

As described by medieval scholar Madeleine Pelner Cosman, medical practitioners in the Middle Ages recommended partridge as a food of love: They suggested that "Partridge was superior in arousing dulled passions and increasing the powers of engendering. Gentle to the human stomach, partridge stimulated bodily fluids, raised the spirits, and firmed the muscles."

Probably the most famous reference to the partridge is in the Christmas carol, "The Twelve Days of Christmas".  The first gift listed is "a partridge in a pear tree", and these words end each verse. Since partridges are unlikely to be seen in pear-trees (they are ground-nesting birds) it has been suggested that the text "a pear tree" is a corruption of the French "une perdrix" (a partridge).

The partridge has also been used as a symbol that represents Kurdish nationalism. It is called Kew. Sherko Kurmanj discusses the paradox of symbols in Iraq as an attempt to make a distinction between the Kurds and the Arabs. He says that while Iraqis generally regards the palm tree, falcon, and sword as their national symbols, the Kurds consider the oak, partridge, and dagger as theirs.

Species list in taxonomic order
Genus Lerwa
 Snow partridge, Lerwa lerwa
Genus Tetraophasis 
 Verreaux's monal-partridge, Tetraophasis obscurus
 Szechenyi's monal-partridge, Tetraophasis szechenyii
Genus Alectoris
 Arabian partridge, Alectoris melanocephala
 Przevalski's partridge, Alectoris magna
 Rock partridge, Alectoris graeca
 Chukar, Alectoris chukar
 Philby's partridge, Alectoris philbyi
 Barbary partridge, Alectoris barbara
 Red-legged partridge, Alectoris rufa
Genus Ammoperdix
See-see partridge, Ammoperdix griseogularis
 Sand partridge, Ammoperdix heyi
Genus Perdix
 Grey partridge, Perdix perdix
 Daurian partridge, Perdix dauurica
 Tibetan partridge, Perdix hodgsoniae
Genus Rhizothera
 Long-billed partridge, Rhizothera longirostris
 Dulit partridge, Rhizothera dulitensis
Genus Margaroperdix
 Madagascar partridge, Margaroperdix madagascarensis
Genus Melanoperdix
 Black wood-partridge, Melanoperdix nigra
Genus Xenoperdix
 Rubeho forest partridge, Xenoperdix obscuratus
 Udzungwa forest partridge, Xenoperdix udzungwensis
Genus Arborophila, the hill partridges
 Hill partridge, Arborophila torqueola
 Sichuan partridge, Arborophila rufipectus
 Chestnut-breasted partridge, Arborophila mandellii
 White-necklaced partridge, Arborophila gingica
 Rufous-throated partridge, Arborophila rufogularis
 White-cheeked partridge, Arborophila atrogularis
 Taiwan partridge, Arborophila crudigularis
 Hainan partridge, Arborophila ardens
 Chestnut-bellied partridge, Arborophila javanica
 Grey-breasted partridge, Arborophila orientalis
 Bar-backed partridge, Arborophila brunneopectus
 Orange-necked partridge, Arborophila davidi
 Chestnut-headed partridge, Arborophila cambodiana
 Red-breasted partridge, Arborophila hyperythra
 Red-billed partridge, Arborophila rubrirostris
 Sumatran partridge, Arborophila sumatrana
Genus Tropicoperdix
 Scaly-breasted partridge, Tropicoperdix chloropus
 Chestnut-necklaced partridge, Tropicoperdix charltonii
Genus Caloperdix
 Ferruginous partridge, Caloperdix oculea
Genus Haematortyx
 Crimson-headed partridge, Haematortyx sanguiniceps
Genus Rollulus
 Crested partridge, Rollulus roulroul
Genus Bambusicola
 Mountain bamboo partridge, Bambusicola fytchii
 Chinese bamboo partridge, Bambusicola thoracica

See also
Dick Potts, English ecologist and specialist in the grey partridge.

References

External links

 Videos, photos and sounds - Internet Bird Collection

Bird common names